Daniel Pérez (born 13 August 1984 in Asunción) is a Paraguayan basketball player.

He has been a member of the Paraguayan national basketball team since 2003, and participated in five South American Basketball Championships and the 2011 FIBA Americas Championship.

References

1984 births
Living people
Sportspeople from Asunción
Paraguayan men's basketball players